Vanessa Marie Semrow (born November 13, 1984) is an American beauty queen who won Miss Teen USA 2002.

Personal life
Semrow was born as Vanessa Marie Semrow in Rhinelander, Wisconsin, and she is of both American and Thai descent; her mother is Thai, while her father is American.

Pageantry
Semrow won the Miss Wisconsin Teen USA title on October 15, 2001, in a pageant paying tribute to the events of September 11 that year. In August 2002, she represented Wisconsin in the Miss Teen USA 2002 pageant.

As Miss Teen USA, Semrow represented the Miss Universe Organization and lived in a Trump apartment in New York City, the first Miss Teen USA titleholder to live there full-time. During her reign, Semrow traveled to Kuwait and Saudi Arabia on a USO tour, raised money for charities, and attended celebrity events. Her reign ended on August 13, 2003, when she crowned Tami Farrell Miss Teen USA 2003.

References

Living people
2002 beauty pageant contestants
21st-century Miss Teen USA delegates
Miss Teen USA winners
People from Rhinelander, Wisconsin
1984 births
American people of Thai descent